Bo Inge Andersson (born 16 October 1955) is a Swedish businessman and former army officer.

Andersson's career included roles as head of purchasing at Saab Automobile, head of global purchasing and supply chain at General Motors, CEO for the turn-around of GAZ Group, the first non-Russian CEO at Avtovaz, where he worked from December 2013 to 3 April 2016, or various positions at Yazaki.

Education 
Bo Inge Andersson grew up in the south of Sweden. He graduated from the Swedish Army Academy and then served in the army. He left the military with the rank of Major. Andersson received a bachelor's degree from Stockholm University and completed the Top Management program at Harvard University.

Career

General Motors 
Andersson began his business career in 1987 as a purchasing manager in Saab Automotive AB where in 1990 he was promoted to the Vice-President of Saab Purchasing. In 1993 he moved to Detroit to work at the position of Executive Director of Electrical Purchasing Group at General Motors (GM). A year later he was appointed Executive Director of Chemicals Purchasing Group for GM and worked in this position for three years. In 1997 he moved to Germany to hold position of Vice-President for Purchasing in Europe. In 2001 Andersson became part of GM top management working as Vice-President for Purchasing worldwide till 2007 and as Vice-President of Global Purchasing and Supply Chain to 2009.

Andersson left GM in 2009 and became an advisor to Oleg Deripaska (a Russian industrial tycoon) and a head of Board of Directors of GAZ Group - the oldest car plant in Russia and the largest manufacturer of light commercial vehicles, buses and off-road heavy trucks.

GAZ Group 
Andersson became the president of GAZ Group on August 7, 2009 with objective to combine development of company's strategy with running current operations.

AVTOVAZ 
On November 5, 2013 Andersson was appointed the President of JSC AVTOVAZ the largest Russian car manufacturer which produced old fashioned Lada branded vehicles and was losing market share. The Swedish manager has become the first foreign president of the company.

Announced his resignation on the 17 February 2016. He agreed to remain in his role until April 3 to support the transition to new leadership. From April 2016 Andersson is the CEO of Bo Group Enterprises. From April 2016 through June 2017, Andersson was CEO of Bo Group Enterprises.

In 2016 in his post as general director of AvtoVAZ in Russia, he liquidated the Manufacture of technological equipment and the Pilot production of AvtoVAZ. The chairman of the city Duma Tolyatti Nikolay Ostudin accused Bo Andersson of destroying the LADA in the interests of Renault, without providing any arguments and facts.

Yazaki 
From July 2017 through April 2021 Andersson was president of Yazaki Europe. In March 2018, he was named President & CEO of Yazaki North & Central America. This is in addition to his role as President of Yazaki Europe, which he has held since July 2017. He was responsible for 129 locations, in 28 countries, 140,000 team members and more than $8 billion in revenue. He was also head of Yazaki's global purchasing organization.

From April to June 2021, Andersson was senior executive advisor to Yazaki Europe & Africa and North & Central America, to support the transition to the new leadership.  Yazaki is the world's largest producer of electrical wiring harnesses for the automotive industry.

UzAuto Motors 
Andersson was appointed CEO of UzAuto Motors and UzAuto Motors Powertrain – the largest manufacturing subsidiaries of UzAvtoSanoat in August 2021. UzAvtoSanoat is owned by Uzbekistan's government, and produces Chevrolet vehicles under a technical license agreement with GM.

References

External links

Fact sheet authorized by Bo Andersson

1955 births
Living people
People from Falkenberg
General Motors former executives
Swedish chief executives
Swedish emigrants to the United States
Stockholm University alumni
Swedish expatriates in Russia
Swedish Army officers